Jianxi is a town of Mingguang in Anhui province, China. , it has 12 villages under its administration.

References

Township-level divisions of Anhui
Mingguang